Richard Baerwald (1867–1929) was a German academic psychologist, in Berlin.  Towards the end of his life he became interested in parapsychology and occultism (as it was interpreted at the period). He edited the Zeitschrift für Kritischen Okkultismus from 1926 to 1928.

Works
Theorie der Begabung (1896)
Der Mensch ist grösser als das Schicksal (1922)
Die intellektuellen Phänomene (1925)
Okkultismus und Spiritismus und ihre weltanschaulichen Folgerungen (1926) 
Psychologie der Selbstverteidigung in Kampf-, Not- und Krankheitszeiten (1927)

References

Further reading
Perovsky-Petrovo-Solovovo. (1928). Okkultismus und Spiritismus und ihre weltanschaulichen Folgerungen. Journal of the Society for Psychical Research 24: 289–292.

1867 births
1929 deaths
German psychologists
Parapsychologists